Lucien Seignol (13 December 1907 – 28 August 1994) was a French architect. His work was part of the architecture event in the art competition at the 1948 Summer Olympics.

References

1907 births
1994 deaths
20th-century French architects
Olympic competitors in art competitions
Architects from Lyon